Professionals Australia, formerly the Association of Professional Engineers, Scientists and Managers Australia (APESMA), is an Australian trade union registered under state and federal industrial relations acts. It is affiliated with the Australian Council of Trade Unions (ACTU).

Professionals Australia organises workers across a broad range of workplaces and industries. It also performs many of the functions of a professional association as providing registration services for professional Engineers.  Unlike most Australian unions, Professionals Australia is not affiliated to a political party.

Its membership is drawn from diverse professions, including such as engineers, managers, architects, IT professionals, pharmacists, and collieries staff, and is organised along occupational lines.

History

Professionals Australia offer assessment in the areas of Civil, Electrical, Information, Technology and Telecommunications, Management, Mechanical and Structural Engineering.

A new division for video game developers, under Game Workers Unite Australia, will be added in 2022.

Industrial coverage
Professionals Australia has industrial coverage over:

 Managers and Professionals
 Engineers
 Pharmacists
 Scientists
 Architects
 Coal mining industry
 Veterinarians
 Translators and interpreters
 Defence industry
 Information Technology (IT workers)
 Video game workers
 Ambulance managers & professionals (Victoria)
 Local government engineers (New South Wales)

References

External links

Rules of the Association
Member Advantage Benefits Programs
See also Australian Council of Professions

Trade unions in Australia
Engineering societies based in Australia
Trade unions established in 1917
1917 establishments in Australia
T
Professional associations based in Australia